Rob Capriccioso is a journalist and writer who founded the Indigenous Wire publication on the Substack platform. He is the first Indigenous journalist to receive a Substack Pro deal. Indigenous Wire covers policy, politics, media, economics and sovereignty issues.

Background 
Rob Capriccioso is an enrolled citizen of the Sault Ste. Marie Tribe of Chippewa Indians in Sault Ste. Marie, Michigan, He is a political science and psychology alum of the University of Michigan. He resides in metro Washington, DC.

Journalism career 
Capriccioso was the long-time Washington Bureau Chief for Indian Country Today and wrote special features for the publication during the COVID-19 pandemic; before that he worked as a general assignment reporter for ICT starting in 2008. He was later a senior editor based in the Washington, D.C. metro area for Tribal Business News. He was a contributing writer to American Indian Report and News from Indian Country.

Capriccioso covers the White House, the Executive Branch, the United States Congress, the Supreme Court of the United States, and presidential campaigns, 2004 through 2020. He is the first Native American journalist to Q&A a sitting president, President Barack Obama, in an Oct. 4, 2012 news story titled, "President Obama Answers Questions From Indian Country Today Media Network in Unprecedented Exchange.". Previously, he received answers from President George W. Bush for a journalistic website presentation of the former Connect for Kids publication.

He has interviewed such notables as US President Barack Obama, Transportation Secretary Pete Buttigieg, White House Chief of Staff Pete Rouse, Bolivian President Evo Morales (Aymara), Senate Majority Leader Harry Reid, Homeland Security Chief Michael Chertoff,  members of Congress and tribal leaders. His reporting on Indigenous issues was cited in testimony to Congress. His reporting on the Treasury Department's inequitable distributions of pandemic relief funds to tribes was cited in a September 2021 letter from several U.S. senators to the Biden administration. He was a featured speaker at the 2022 SXSW conference, regarding his work as a journalist during the so-called "creator economy."

One of a small number of Native American journalists to contribute to mainstream media, as documented by the Native American Journalists Association, he has served as a contributing editor to Campaigns and Elections, helped launch Politico as its founding website editor,  and has appeared on National Public Radio to discuss Native and political topics of the day. He was a contributor to True/Slant, the Forbes-backed online network. His articles have appeared in American Indian Report, News from Indian Country, The New York Sun, High Country News, The American, Cultural Survival Quarterly, the New York Post'''s PageSix.com, Radar Magazine, TMZ.com, The New York Times and The Guardian''. He was previously a staff reporter on education and youth issues for Connect for Kids, and Inside Higher Ed, in Washington, DC.

Awards and honors 
Capriccioso has won numerous awards throughout his career. These include winning the 2013 Native American Journalists Association (NAJA) award for Best News Story. He won the first and second place awards for the NAJA Best New Story and third place for Best Feature Story in 2014.

See also
 Native American writers

Notes

References
''American Indian Report'’ Volume 24, Issues 5–10. Pages 7, 20, 26.
‘’Silenced!: academic freedom, scientific inquiry, and the First Amendment ...’’ (Praeger, 2007) page 106, by Bruce E. Johansen.
Reading Toni Morrison, By Rachel Lister Page 104.
Native American issues By Paul C. Rosier – Westport, Conn.: Greenwood Press, 2003 – .
Journalism across cultures By Fritz Cropp, Cynthia M. Frisby, Dean Mills – Ames : Iowa State Press, 2003 – ; pages 132–158.
Capriccioso, Rob. "Reading Red 2008." Indian Country Today.
Staff reporter, Indian Country Today
National Public Radio
National Public Radio
National Public Radio

External links 
Tribal Business News
Native Business Magazine
Smithsonian Magazine
American Indian political and cultural articles American Indian Report
News from Indian Country
The New York Sun
High Country News
The American
Cultural Survival Quarterly
The Guardian

Living people
21st-century American journalists
21st-century Native Americans
Journalists from Montana
Journalists from North Dakota
Journalists from South Dakota
Journalists from Washington, D.C.
Native American journalists
Native American writers
Ojibwe people
People from Sault Ste. Marie, Michigan
People from Washington, D.C.
University of Michigan College of Literature, Science, and the Arts alumni
Year of birth missing (living people)